The 2nd South American Youth Championships in Athletics were held in Quito, Ecuador, at the Estadio Atahualpa between November 8–11, 1975.

Medal summary
Medal winners are published for boys and girls.
Complete results can be found on the "World Junior Athletics History" website.  All results are marked as "affected by altitude" (A), because the stadium in Quito is located at 2,780 metres above sea level.

Men

Women

Medal table (unofficial)

Participation (unofficial)
Detailed result lists can be found on the "World Junior Athletics History" website.  An unofficial count yields the number of about 212 athletes from about 7 countries:  

 (39)
 (7)
 (41)
 (33)
 (35)
 (28)
 Perú (29)

References

External links
World Junior Athletics History

South American U18 Championships in Athletics
1975 in Ecuadorian sport
South American U18 Championships
International athletics competitions hosted by Ecuador